Jeffries Wyman (June 21, 1901 – November 4, 1995) was an American molecular biologist and biophysicist notable for his research of proteins, amino acids,  and on the physical chemistry of hemoglobin, including the classic Monod-Wyman-Changeux model.

Wyman was a member of the National Academy of Sciences and of the American Academy of Arts and Sciences, the first scientific advisor to the US Embassy in Paris, director of a regional science office in the Middle East for UNESCO, a founder and past secretary general of the European Molecular Biology Organization, professor of biology at Harvard.
Harvard University established Jeffries Wyman Fellowship in his name.

Chronology 
 1901: born in West Newton, Massachusetts
 1923: Harvard University, graduated with highest honors in philosophy and high honors in biology.
 1926: Ph.D., University College London.
 1928-1951: a professor of biology at Harvard University.
 1955-1958: director of a regional science office in the Middle East for Unesco.
 1958-1984: scientist at the Regina Elena and the Biochemistry Institute of the Sapienza University of Rome.
 1984: retirement.
 1995: dies in Paris, France.

See also 
Gaetano Fichera

Notes

References 
 ( for the PDF edition).
.
.

1901 births
1995 deaths
American physical chemists
American biophysicists
Harvard University faculty
Harvard College alumni
Members of the United States National Academy of Sciences
American molecular biologists
Alumni of University College London